SDQ may refer to:

Las Américas International Airport, Punta Caucedo, Dominican Republic
Strengths and Difficulties Questionnaire, for behavioural screening